The men's 12.5 kilometre pursuit at the 2017 Asian Winter Games was held on February 24, 2017 at the Nishioka Biathlon Stadium.

Schedule
All times are Japan Standard Time (UTC+09:00)

Results

References

External links
Official website

Men pursuit